Victor Mick Fangio (born August 22, 1958) is an American football coach who is the defensive coordinator for the Miami Dolphins of the National Football League (NFL). Fangio also recently served as the head coach of the Denver Broncos. A 41-year coaching veteran with 33 seasons of NFL experience, Fangio was a defensive coordinator for 20 of the last 24 seasons at the NFL or college level before becoming the Broncos’ head coach. He served as the Chicago Bears' defensive coordinator after leading the defenses for the San Francisco 49ers, Stanford University, Houston Texans, Indianapolis Colts and Carolina Panthers.

Fangio’s defenses have consistently been among the most productive in the NFL in a number of categories, including scoring defense, total yards allowed and fewest penalties. His defenses have ranked in the league’s top-five in yards allowed in eight of the last 13 years while placing in the NFL’s top-5 in fewest points allowed seven times over that span.

Coaching career

Early career
In 1975, Fangio played the defensive position of safety at Dunmore High School, outside of Scranton, Pennsylvania. From 1979 to 1981, he returned to his high school as the linebackers coach and defensive coordinator. In 1982, he was the defensive coordinator at Milford Academy, and in 1984 he became a defensive assistant coach for the Philadelphia/Baltimore Stars of the United States Football League (USFL).

New Orleans Saints
Fangio began his NFL career with New Orleans as the team’s linebackers coach from 1986-1994 during which time he coached the famed “Dome Patrol”, one of the greatest defensive groups of all-time. During Fangio’s nine seasons in New Orleans, the Saints ranked among the NFL’s Top 5 in total defense (300.0 ypg – 5th), scoring defense (18.1 ppg – 4th), sacks (408 – 3rd) and takeaways (336 – T-3rd).

Carolina Panthers
Fangio joined the Carolina Panthers in 1995, the inaugural season for the Panthers. He was the defensive coordinator from 1995-98 under head coach Dom Capers and helped the franchise advance to the NFC Championship Game in just its second season.

Indianapolis Colts
Fangio coached the defense for the Colts from 1999-2001 under head coach Jim Mora Sr.

Houston Texans
Fangio joined another first-year team in the Houston Texans in 2002. He was Dom Capers' defensive coordinator in Houston from 2002-05.

Baltimore Ravens

Fangio joined the Baltimore Ravens in 2006 and worked as a special assistant to the head coach/defensive assistant for his first three years with the Ravens and later coached a linebackers group in 2009 that featured All-Pro Ray Lewis.

Stanford and San Francisco 49ers
In 2010, he was the defensive coordinator for the Stanford Cardinal under head coach Jim Harbaugh, and in 2011 he followed Harbaugh to the San Francisco 49ers when Harbaugh was hired as the 49ers' head coach. Along with Harbaugh, he was credited with turning around the 49ers defense, producing a league-high 35 turnovers in 2011. Fangio was released from his contract by the 49ers on January 15, 2015 after Harbaugh was let go.

Chicago Bears
On January 19, 2015, Fangio agreed in principle to become the defensive coordinator for the Chicago Bears. After the departure of outside linebackers coach Clint Hurtt in 2017, Fangio assumed that position in addition to his role as defensive coordinator. During Fangio's first three seasons in Chicago, the Bears defense improved from a 30th-ranked unit in 2014 to being 14th, 15th, and 10th in total defense.

Fangio's contract expired following the 2017 season and he interviewed for the Bears' head coaching position on January 3, 2018. The head coaching position ultimately went to Matt Nagy. Nine days later, Fangio signed a three-year extension with the Bears to continue as their defensive coordinator, making him the first Bears defensive coordinator to stay under a new head coach since Buddy Ryan with newly-arriving head Mike Ditka in 1982. Fangio was also granted complete control of the defense. Under Fangio, the 2018 Bears defense excelled as it led the NFL in turnovers forced (36) and interceptions (27). Chicago was also ranked third in total defense, second in yards per play allowed, and first in scoring defense. On January 17, 2019, Fangio was named Assistant Coach of the Year by the Pro Football Writers Association. A month later, he received the same honor from the Associated Press at the 8th Annual NFL Honors.

Denver Broncos
On January 10, 2019, Fangio was hired to become the 17th head coach of the  Denver Broncos.

2019 season

As Fangio assembled his staff, defensive backs coach Ed Donatell followed him from Chicago to serve as his defensive coordinator, as did outside linebackers coach Brandon Staley for the same position. On September 9, 2019, Fangio lost his regular season head coaching debut against the Oakland Raiders by a score of 16–24. On October 6, 2019, Fangio recorded his first career win as head coach in a 20–13 win against the Los Angeles Chargers. In Fangio's first season as head coach, he led the Broncos to a 7–9 record, finishing 2nd in the AFC West.

2020 season

In Fangio's second season as head coach, the Broncos lost their star defensive player in Von Miller for the season, due to injury. The Broncos began the 2020 season with a 16–14 loss to the Tennessee Titans on September 14, 2020. On September 21, 2020, Fangio was fined  by the NFL for not properly wearing a face mask, as required for coaches during the COVID-19 pandemic, during a Week 2 game. On November 28, 2020, Broncos' backup quarterback Jeff Driskel had tested positive for COVID-19, and starting quarterback Drew Lock, as well as third and fourth quarterbacks Brett Rypien and Blake Bortles, had been in physical contact with Driskel without wearing protective masks. Accordingly, all four were placed in league-mandated quarantine and were deemed ineligible to play in the Week 12 game against the New Orleans Saints on November 29, 2020. Undrafted wide receiver Kendall Hinton, who played quarterback at Wake Forest and was promoted from the practice squad, served as the emergency starter, with running back Royce Freeman as the backup. The Broncos would go on to lose against the Saints by a score of 31–3. Lock, Rypien and Bortles were activated from the Reserve/COVID-19 list on December 1, 2020 and returned to the active roster in preparation for the team's Week 13 game at the Kansas City Chiefs, while Driskel returned to the active roster on December 16, 2020. On December 2, 2020, Fangio announced that the team had fined all four of its quarterbacks for violating COVID-19 protocols and not wearing masks while in close contact of each other. In his second season, Fangio led the Broncos to a 5–11 record, finishing 4th in the AFC West.

2021 season

Fangio led the Broncos to a 3–0 start before going 4–10 the rest of the way. After the Broncos lost to the Kansas City Chiefs in the regular season finale, the Broncos parted ways with Fangio. Fangio finished his tenure with the Broncos with a  record in three seasons.

On February 12, 2022, following his departure from Denver, Fangio announced that he would not coach with a team during the 2022 season.

Philadelphia Eagles
Fangio was spotted at a few practices that the Philadelphia Eagles had during their 2022 training camp. On October 10, 2022, news broke that the Eagles had hired Fangio to serve as a consultant. He had been serving in the role for the season, but the team managed to keep the news quiet. Fangio signed a two-week long contract to help with the Eagles' preparation for Super Bowl LVII against the Kansas City Chiefs.

Miami Dolphins
On February 15, 2023, Fangio was hired as a defensive coordinator by the Miami Dolphins.

Head coaching record

References

External links
 Miami Dolphins bio

1958 births
Living people
Baltimore Ravens coaches
Carolina Panthers coaches
Chicago Bears coaches
Denver Broncos head coaches
Houston Texans coaches
Indianapolis Colts coaches
Miami Dolphins coaches
New Orleans Saints coaches
North Carolina Tar Heels football coaches
San Francisco 49ers coaches
Stanford Cardinal football coaches
National Football League defensive coordinators
United States Football League coaches
High school football coaches in Connecticut
High school football coaches in Pennsylvania
East Stroudsburg University of Pennsylvania alumni
People from Dunmore, Pennsylvania
Coaches of American football from Pennsylvania